Pelorus Bridge is a tiny locality in Marlborough, New Zealand where the Rai River meets Pelorus River.  crosses the Pelorus River at Pelorus Bridge Scenic Reserve, which was used as one of the film locations for The Hobbit: The Desolation of Smaug. You can take a guided kayak tour to experience this Hobbit filming location.

The scenic reserve contains one of the last stands of original river flat forest in the area. The forest contains a mixture of beech and other broadleaf species, as well as mature podocarps such as rimu, kahikatea and totara towering over the canopy. Several easy walking tracks connect the camping ground, picnic site, river, and the carparks. A circular walk leads over a pedestrian suspension bridge over the Rai River.

The closest small towns are Rai Valley 7 km to the north, and Canvastown 8 km to the east. A cafe is situated at the Pelorus Bridge Scenic Reserve.

History
The first Pelorus Bridge was built in 1863. Since 1885, when a second bridge was built, the route between Nelson and the Wairau Valley followed the course of the present road.  The Pelorus Valley was forested until the early 1880s.  From 1881 until the early 20th century, most of the lowland forest was milled. In 1865, a township was planned for the area at Pelorus Bridge, however, the plans were delayed in 1912 and the area eventually became a scenic reserve.

Vegetation and Wildlife 
The lowland forest at Pelorus Bridge consists of mature podocarps like rimu, kahikatea, miro, mataī and tōtara and black, hard, red and silver beech trees. Birds present include korimako, tūī, pīwakawaka and kererū. A population of long-tailed bats live in the forest. A rare and primitive beetle, Horelophus walkeri lives in the splash zone of waterfalls in the area.

References

External links

 Pelorus Bridge Scenic Reserve (DoC website)

Populated places in the Marlborough Region